This is a list of heritage-listed buildings in Geelong, Australia, which have been listed on the Victorian Heritage Register, which provides the highest level of protection afforded to a building in the state of Victoria. This article only includes buildings and sites in the Geelong city centre; historic buildings and sites in suburbs and surrounding towns are listed in their respective articles.

See also

References

Buildings and structures in Geelong
Geelong, Heritage
Geelong, Heritage listed buildings
Geelong-related lists